Normanna is a census-designated place in Bee County, Texas, United States. The population was 113 at the 2010 census.

Geography
Normanna is located in northern Bee County at  (28.528761, -97.783742). U.S. Route 181 passes through the center of the CDP, leading south  to Beeville, the county seat, and north  to Kenedy.

Demographics
As of the census of 2000, there were 121 people, 61 households, and 30 families residing in the CDP. The population density was 91.1 people per square mile (35.1/km2). There were 76 housing units at an average density of 57.2/sq mi (22.1/km2). The racial makeup of the CDP was 83.47% White, 4.13% African American, 12.40% from other races. Hispanic or Latino of any race were 42.98% of the population.

There were 61 households, out of which 24.6% had children under the age of 18 living with them, 39.3% were married couples living together, 8.2% had a female householder with no husband present, and 49.2% were non-families. 44.3% of all households were made up of individuals, and 18.0% had someone living alone who was 65 years of age or older. The average household size was 1.98 and the average family size was 2.84.

In the CDP, the population was spread out, with 22.3% under the age of 18, 5.8% from 18 to 24, 25.6% from 25 to 44, 24.0% from 45 to 64, and 22.3% who were 65 years of age or older. The median age was 41 years. For every 100 females, there were 101.7 males. For every 100 females age 18 and over, there were 95.8 males.

The median income for a household in the CDP was $19,063, and the median income for a family was $28,125. Males had a median income of $25,156 versus $16,250 for females. The per capita income for the CDP was $15,954. There were 6.5% of families and 10.0% of the population living below the poverty line, including no under eighteens and 7.9% of those over 64.

Education
Normanna is served by the Pettus Independent School District.

Climate
The climate in this area is characterized by hot, humid summers and generally mild to cool winters.  According to the Köppen Climate Classification system, Normanna has a humid subtropical climate, abbreviated "Cfa" on climate maps.

References

External links
 Handbook of Texas Online article

Census-designated places in Bee County, Texas
Census-designated places in Texas